Ek Vivaah... Aisa Bhi (English: A Marriage like this, too) is a 2008 Indian Hindi-language romantic drama film based on the story of Ashapurna Devi. The film is directed by Kaushik Ghatak and stars Isha Koppikar and Sonu Sood. Ek Vivaah... Aisa Bhi was released on 7 November 2008.

Plot
Ek Vivaah... Aisa Bhi is the story of Chandni who belongs to a middle-class family living in Bhopal and Prem who is an unconventional ghazal singer and hails from an upper-middle-class family. Chandni’s mother died when she was 15 and she has two very young brother and sister. Chandni and Prem meet to practice for a Ghazal competition and fall in love. Families meet and agree for their marriage. On the day of their engagement, Chandni's father dies leaving her younger brother and younger sister dependent on Chandni herself. Initially Chandni decides to leave the house and her siblings under the care of her paternal uncle- however when she realizes that her unscrupulous uncle and aunt want only the house and care two hoots about her siblings, she decides to bring them up herself. Prem promises to wait for her and assists her in her troubles- while at the same time having become a famous ghazal singer.

Chandni sacrifices her dream of becoming a singer and start giving music lessons at home. She also sings in parties and weddings to earn livelihood. Years pass by, her siblings have grown up now. Her brother graduates with flying colours and lands up with a good job. He insists Chandni to leave all the responsibilities on him. She insists that he marry his long-time girlfriend Natasha. Since Natasha is from an affluent family, he believes that she won’t understand their culture and lifestyle. But he marries her anyway.
 
Believing that now Anuj and Natasha will take care of the ancestral house, Chandni and Prem decide to get married. But Chandni’s problems never seem to end. Chandni's brothers wife Natasha refusing to keep up with traditions and demanding a separate life with her husband.

Prem’s mother who had grown old and wants to see her son married requests Chandni to marry him or leave him for good. Chandni who has already sent her brother with his wife to lead a separate life, cannot leave her sister alone. She wants to send her sister abroad for further studies. She asks Prem to forget her and get married for his mother’s sake.

Chandni’s student who is settled with his family abroad agrees to help arrange Chandni’s sister’s studies. His mother then gets a thought of getting them married. Chandni agrees and plans to go on a pilgrimage after this. On the other hand, Anuj feels helpless being separated from his sisters. Natasha’s father makes her realise her mistake and understand the importance of family.

In the end, Natasha and Anuj returns home in younger sister’s marriage. Chandni is now free from her responsibilities. Prem returns with his mother to finally take Chandni to his home. Chandni and Prem's marriage is arranged and they are shown singing in a show together signifying that they lived happily ever after.

Cast
 Sonu Sood as Prem Ajmera
 Isha Koppikar as Chandni Shrivastava Ajmera
 Vishal Malhotra as Anuj B. Shrivastava, Chandni's younger brother
 Anand Abhyankar as Chandni's uncle 
 Amrita Prakash as Sandhya B. Shrivastava, Chandni's younger sister
 Alok Nath as Bhushan Shrivastava died in face appearance Anupam Kher
 Smita Jaykar Mrs Ajmera (Prem's mother)
 Chhavi Mittal as Natasha A. Shrivastava
 Vallabh Vyas as Dr. Prabhat

Soundtrack
 
Ravindra Jain was the music director and lyricist of this album.

References

External links 
 
 

2008 films
2000s Hindi-language films
Rajshri Productions films
Films about Indian weddings
Films based on works by Ashapurna Devi